Alex Bolt was the defending champion but chose not to defend his title.

Enrique López Pérez won the title after defeating Evgeny Karlovskiy 6–1, 6–4 in the final.

Seeds
All seeds receive a bye into the second round.

Draw

Finals

Top half

Section 1

Section 2

Bottom half

Section 3

Section 4

References
Main Draw
Qualifying Draw

Singles